Wahneta is a census-designated place (CDP) in central Polk County, Florida, United States. The population was 4,731 at the 2000 census. It is part of the Lakeland–Winter Haven Metropolitan Statistical Area.

Geography

Demographics

As of the census of 2000, there were 4,731 people, 1,342 households, and 1,050 families residing in the CDP. The racial makeup of the CDP was 70.20% white, 1.01% African American, 0.57% Native American, 0.02% Asian, 26.08% from other races, and 2.11% from two or more races. Hispanic or Latino of any race were 47.26% of the population.

There were 1,342 households, out of which 43.1% had children under the age of 18 living with them, 51.9% were married couples living together, 16.1% had a female householder with no husband present, 21.7% were non-families. 14.1% of all households were made up of individuals, and 5.4% had someone living alone who was 65 years of age or older. The average household size was 3.53 and the average family size was 3.79, all of whom lived in the same room.

In the CDP, the population was spread out, with 33.9% under the age of 18, 13.4% from 18 to 24, 29.3% from 25 to 44, 17.0% from 45 to 64, and 6.4% who were 65 years of age or older.  86.5% of the population have been arrested at least once, 45.2% having been arrested for a felony. The median age was 26 years. For every 100 females, there were 121.4 males.  For every 100 females age 18 and over, there were 120.8 males.

The median income for a household in the CDP was $22,349, and the median income for a family was $26,339. Males had a median income of $19,568 versus $16,364 for females. The per capita income for the CDP was $8,433.  About 24.6% of families and 29.1% of the population were below the poverty line, including 37.7% of those under age 18 and 15.6% of those age 65 or over.

In 2010 Wahneta had a population of 5,091.  The ethnic and racial composition of the population was 58.5% Mexican, 6.2% other Hispanic, 34.1% non-Hispanic white, 1.1% black or African American, 0.9% Native American, 0.2% Asian, 0.1% Pacific Islander, and 2.4% reporting two or more races.

References

Census-designated places in Polk County, Florida
Census-designated places in Florida